Börje Grönroos (13 January 1929 – 17 December 2015) was a Finnish boxer. He competed in the men's middleweight event at the 1952 Summer Olympics.

References

External links
 

1929 births
2015 deaths
Finnish male boxers
Olympic boxers of Finland
Boxers at the 1952 Summer Olympics
Sportspeople from Helsinki
Middleweight boxers
20th-century Finnish people